Mohan Maharishi is  an Indian theatre director, actor and a playwright. He was awarded the Sangeet Natak Akademi Award for 'Direction' in 1992.

Early life
Mohan Maharishi graduated from National School of Drama, New Delhi in 1965, and later served as its Director 1984-86.

Career
Mohan Maharishi is most known for his revolutionary plays in Hindi, such as Einstein (1994), Raja Ki Rasoi  Vidyottamā, and Saanp Seedhi and also countless Hindi plays that he has directed over the years, including,  Andhayug, Rani Jindan (Punjabi), Othello, Ho Rahega Kuchh Na Kuchh inspired by Marsha Norman's 1983 English play, "'Night, Mother"  and Dear Bapu (2008). Amongst notable play written by him include, "Einstein", "Raja Ki Rasoi", "Joseph Ka Mukadma", "Deewar Mein Ek Khirkee Rahati Thi" and  "Ho Rahega Kuch Na Kuch" Drama.   He has also worked in historical Series Bharat Ek Khoj which was produced and directed by Shyam Benegal in that he played the role of Muslim Social reformer Sir Syed Ahmed Khan.

Previously, he had also remained the Theatre Advisor to the Government of Mauritius (1973–1979). After his return from Mauritius he started teaching at 'Department of Indian Theatre', Panjab University, Chandigarh, and in 1987, he started his second tenure as the Professor and Department Head of the Department of Indian Theatre, Panjab University, Chandigarh, and lived in Chandigarh till his retirement in 2004, and moving back to New Delhi, he set up Natwa Theatre Society.

Mohan Maharishi is known for his simplistic yet theatrically sound and heartwarming productions and is widely regarded as one of the best directors Indian theatre has ever produced.

References

External links
 ‘Dear Bapu’, at National School of Drama’s ‘Bharat Rang Mahotsav, 2008’

National School of Drama alumni
Indian male dramatists and playwrights
Indian theatre directors
Recipients of the Sangeet Natak Akademi Award
Indian drama teachers
Academic staff of the National School of Drama
Living people
Hindi dramatists and playwrights
Hindi theatre
Indian arts administrators
Year of birth missing (living people)